Marzieh Afkham is an Iranian diplomat who served as the ambassador to Malaysia for four years.

She is former spokeswoman and head of the Center for Public and Media Diplomacy in Iran's Ministry of Foreign Affairs, the first female spokesperson for the ministry. On 8 November 2015 was appointed as ambassador to Malaysia, becoming the first female Iranian ambassador since the 1979 revolution and the second in history after Mehrangiz Dowlatshahi.

References

External link

Living people
Iranian women diplomats
21st-century Iranian women politicians
21st-century Iranian politicians
Islamic Azad University alumni
Politicians from Tehran
Ambassadors of Iran to Malaysia
Spokespersons for the Ministry of Foreign Affairs of Iran
Iranian women ambassadors
Year of birth missing (living people)